Leptozestis euryplaca is a moth in the family Cosmopterigidae. It was described by Oswald Bertram Lower in 1893. It is found in Australia, where it has been recorded from South Australia and Queensland.

References

Cosmopteriginae
Moths described in 1893